Iłowo-Osada  is a village in Działdowo County, Warmian-Masurian Voivodeship, in northern Poland. It is the seat of the gmina (administrative district) called Gmina Iłowo-Osada. It is located in the historic region of Masuria.

The village has a population of 2,800.

History
Initially, the villages of Iłowo-Osada and Iłowo-Wieś formed one village, simply named Iłowo. It was divided only after 1945. In the late 19th century, the village had an almost entirely Polish population of 416.

World War II

Following the invasion of Poland by Nazi Germany, Iłowo became the location of one of three sub-camps of the Soldau concentration camp in nearby Działdowo. The Iłowo transit camp existed in 1941–45. Prisoners were held at a brick building (pictured) and the adjacent barracks.

Up to 2,000 Polish children 5-years-old and younger were among the prisoners as well as pregnant women-inmates awaiting birth (see also Kidnapping of children by Nazi Germany). The men, including Poles and the Soviets (following Operation Barbarossa), were kept there usually for several days only. Many children belonged to slave labourers already deported to the Third Reich. The children underwent selection for Germanization before being sent to German families. Among those who were not selected death rate was very high. There were no medicines in the camp and no doctors. The food and water were rationed. After giving birth women prisoners were sent back to work camps.

In 1940 and 1942, the German gendarmerie and police also carried out expulsions of local Poles, whose houses and workshops were then handed over to German colonists as part of the Lebensraum policy.

Transport
There is a train station in the village.

Sports
The local football club is Polonia Iłowo. It competes in the lower leagues.

Notable residents
 Hans Kummetz (1890-1918), German flying ace
 Oskar Kummetz (1891–1980), German admiral
 Henryk Szordykowski, Polish athlete

References

Villages in Działdowo County